The  is a now-defunct yakuza gang formerly based in Numazu, Shizuoka, Japan. It was an organization of the tekiya.

It was designated by the Japanese police as a boryokudan group in July, 1993.  It disbanded in November 2004, and its boryokudan status was removed the following May.  

When the group disbanded, approximately half its members retired.  The other half are still active yakuza working for the Fifth Yamaguchi-gumi syndicate.

Organizations disestablished in 2004
2004 disestablishments in Japan
Yakuza groups